Dayyan Neve (born 31 March 1978) is an Australian professional surfer.

Surfing

Victories
 2003 : Salomon Masters, Margaret River, Western Australia (WQS)
 2003 : Mark Richards Pro, Newcastle, New South Wales

WCT
 2008 : 19th
 2007 : 32nd recovered from its 19th place (WQS)

In 2009 he was nominated as one of Cleo (magazine)'s Bachelor of the Year award.

References

1978 births
World Surf League surfers
Living people
Australian surfers
New Zealand emigrants to Australia